Harry Brüll (12 April 1935 – 9 January 2021) was a Dutch footballer. He played in two matches for the Netherlands national football team in 1959.

References

External links
 

1935 births
2021 deaths
Dutch footballers
Netherlands international footballers
People from Sittard
Association football defenders
MVV Maastricht players
Fortuna Sittard players